Sun Te-hsiung (born 30 January 1930) is a Taiwanese politician, who served as the Minister of the Research, Development and Evaluation Commission of the Executive Yuan from 1991 to 1994.

References

Living people
National Taiwan University alumni
Political office-holders in the Republic of China on Taiwan
University of Michigan alumni
1930 births